"Scorn Not His Simplicity" is a song written by the Irish musician and songwriter Phil Coulter and performed on his albums Classic Tranquility and The Songs I Love So Well.

The song has also been performed by several Irish musicians, including Luke Kelly, Sinéad O'Connor, Paddy Reilly, The Dubliners, Sonny Knowles, The Irish Tenors, Celtic Thunder, Paul Byrom, George Donaldson, Mike Denver.

Background

Phil Coulter's first son was born with Down syndrome, and several months later the father wrote the song "Scorn Not His Simplicity" about his experiences with his son's disorder. He first played the song to Luke Kelly. Because of the personal sentiment of the song, Luke Kelly felt that the song should not be sung except for special occasions, and not during every performance. The song appears on The Dubliners 1970 LP Revolution.

See also
List of Irish ballads

References

Irish folk songs
The Dubliners songs
Songs written by Phil Coulter
Year of song missing